Robert Glenn Ray (born October 1, 1991) is an American professional baseball pitcher for the Seattle Mariners of Major League Baseball (MLB). He previously played for the Detroit Tigers, Arizona Diamondbacks, and Toronto Blue Jays. Ray was an MLB All-Star in 2017 and won the American League Cy Young Award in 2021, when he led the league in earned run average and strikeouts.

Early life 
Ray was born on October 1, 1991, in Brentwood, Tennessee. Growing up in the Nashville area, Ray often played youth baseball on travel teams alongside future Major League Baseball (MLB) All-Star Mookie Betts. Although he and Betts were on the same travel teams, they played against each other at their respective high schools, with Ray attending Brentwood and Betts at John Overton. During his senior year of high school, Ray posted a 7–1 win–loss record and a 0.50 earned run average (ERA), striking out 95 batters while walking only 13. He also pitched three no-hitters that year, including one perfect game against Centennial High School.

Professional career

Washington Nationals organization
After de-committing from Vanderbilt University, Ray had planned to play college baseball for the Arkansas Razorbacks when he was selected by the Washington Nationals in the 12th round of the 2010 MLB Draft. He signed with the team on August 14, just before the deadline for draftees, and accepted a signing bonus of $799,000, an amount typically allotted for fourth-round draft picks. Because he signed so late in the season, Ray had limited time to play in the minor leagues in 2010. He pitched only one inning that season, striking out two batters in an appearance for the Vermont Lake Monsters of the New York–Penn League. After spending five weeks at extended spring training Ray's first professional baseball start came on May 10, 2011, when he pitched five innings for the Class A Hagerstown Suns, striking out six and walking none. Although Hagerstown missed the South Atlantic League playoffs, Ray had a standout season, going 2–3 with a 3.13 ERA in 20 starts.

Promoted to the Potomac Nationals for the 2012 season, Ray struggled with the jump to Class A-Advanced. He went 4–12 with a 6.56 ERA, walking 49 and striking out 86 in  innings. Ray described the season as "put[ting] me in my place and show[ing] me what I needed to work on", and he spent the offseason adjusting his pitching mechanics with the help of minor league pitching coach Chris Michalak. By turning his hip mid-pitch and lifting his arm slot, Ray was able to isolate the strike zone, and increase his confidence as a pitcher. Leading the Carolina League (CAR) with 93 strikeouts and tying for fourth with an ERA of 2.84 in the first half, Ray was named to the CAR All-Star Team. After going 6–3 with a 3.11 ERA in 16 starts and striking out 100 batters in 84 innings, Ray was promoted to the Double-A Harrisburg Senators on July 5, 2013. He recorded a complete game shutout in only his second Double-A start, allowing just three singles and striking out 11 in a victory over the Erie SeaWolves. In 11 starts for Harrisburg, Ray went 5–2 with a 3.72 ERA, striking out 60 batters in 58 innings.

Detroit Tigers

On December 3, 2013, the Nationals traded Ray, Ian Krol, and Steve Lombardozzi Jr. to the Detroit Tigers for Doug Fister, a move that was part of general manager Dave Dombrowski's larger plan to cut the Tigers' payroll and invest in pitching prospects. Ray received an invitation to join the Tigers for spring training, with the stipulation that he would only be considered for the major league starting rotation if Justin Verlander was not yet ready to return from core muscle surgery. Ray ultimately began the season with the Triple-A Toledo Mud Hens, serving as the No. 3 starter in a rotation that alternated between left- and right-handed pitchers. When Aníbal Sánchez was placed on the disabled list with a middle finger laceration, Ray, who had gone 3–2 with a 1.59 ERA in five starts for Toledo, was called up to fill his spot in the rotation. Ray made his MLB debut on May 6, 2014, allowing only one run on five hits in  innings of an 11–4 rout of the Houston Astros. He was the first Tigers pitcher to win his first major league start at the age of 22 or younger since Jeff Weaver in 1999.

After two spot starts for Detroit, Ray was sent back down to Toledo, where he remained until August 10, when he was once again called up to fill in for Sánchez. Ray struggled during this second call-up, which was extended after Sánchez's strained pectoral muscle turned out to be a more severe injury than anticipated. Ray pitched in nine games for the Tigers, starting six, during which he went 1–4 with an 8.16 ERA. He found more success in Toledo, posting a 7–6 record and 4.22 ERA in 20 games (19 starts). After the regular season ended, Ray showed signs of improvement in the Arizona Fall League, where he allowed only one run and struck out 12 in his first two starts for the Glendale Desert Dogs. In four starts for Glendale, Ray went 1–1 with a 2.45 ERA, striking out 13 batters in 11 innings of work.

Arizona Diamondbacks
The Tigers traded Ray to the Arizona Diamondbacks on December 5, 2014, as part of a three-team trade also involving the New York Yankees: Ray and Domingo Leyba went from Detroit to Arizona, Didi Gregorius went from Arizona to New York, and Shane Greene went from New York to Detroit. Once there, he was assigned to the Triple-A Reno Aces to open the 2015 season. When Archie Bradley was hit in the face with a line drive, Ray was called up for a spot start in the second game of a doubleheader against the Colorado Rockies on May 6. He allowed one run on five hits in six innings and took Arizona to a 5–1 victory. When Bradley suffered another injury on June 4, Ray was once again recalled to take his place in the rotation. With a 5–12 record and 3.52 ERA, Arizona Chief Baseball Officer Tony La Russa was confident in Ray's development over the course of the 2015 season, with his increased command leading to 108 strikeouts in  innings.

Ray was named to a major league opening day roster for the first time in 2016, serving as the Diamondbacks' No. 5 starter. He started the season in a slump, going over a month between his first and second wins of the season, with the second coming in a 12–2 rout of the Yankees on May 16. He hit his first career home run on June 7, a solo shot against Chris Archer of the Tampa Bay Rays. In 32 starts for the Diamondbacks, Ray was 8–15 with a 4.90 ERA in 2016. His season was marked by inconsistency: Ray had 11.3 strikeouts per nine innings (K/9), becoming only the 11th pitcher in MLB history to do so, and he recorded 218 strikeouts in  innings, but his ERA was also the third-worst of any pitcher with 200 or more strikeouts in a single season. In terms of Wins Above Replacement (WAR), he was at 0.7 by Baseball-Reference.com, 3.0 by FanGraphs, and 4.8 by Baseball Prospectus.

Ray had an unremarkable start to the 2017 season, with a 4.57 ERA through eight starts. At that point, Randy Johnson, who was serving as a special assistant to the Diamondbacks' president, spoke with Ray and told him, "You better figure this out, because you never know what your last pitch is going to be." From there, Ray went on a -inning scoreless streak, including his first major league complete game shutout, coming on May 30 against the Pittsburgh Pirates. As the Diamondbacks' No. 2 starter behind Zack Greinke, Ray finished the first half of the season with eight wins and a 2.97 ERA, leading to his first All-Star Game selection. Ray's season was interrupted on July 28, when he was hit in the head with a  line drive from Luke Voit of the St. Louis Cardinals. Ray fell to the ground and was placed on concussion protocols, only returning to the mound on August 24. Ray made 28 regular-season starts for Arizona, going 15–5 with a 2.89 ERA in the process. The Diamondbacks propelled to 93 wins, the best record since the franchise began, while Ray boasted 12.1 K/9 and held his opponents to a batting average of .199, the best of any Diamondback since Johnson's .197 in 2004. Ray made his first postseason start with  innings of relief in the 2017 National League Wild Card Game against the Colorado Rockies. Although the Diamondbacks won that game and advanced to the 2017 National League Division Series (NLDS), the need to use Ray in the Wild Card Game pushed his start from Game 1 to Game 2 of the NLDS. There, he surrendered three runs in  innings of an eventual 8–5 defeat at the hands of the Los Angeles Dodgers. The Dodgers swept the Diamondbacks in three games, eliminating Arizona from postseason contention.

After going 2–0 with a 4.88 ERA in his first four starts of the 2018 season, Ray left his April 30 start against the Nationals with a strained oblique muscle and no timetable for his return. He returned on June 27, pitching six innings and allowing two hits in a 2–1 victory over the Miami Marlins. Upon his return, Ray struggled with going deep into games: on his third time through the order, batters would hit .286 against him; the season prior, it would take four times through the lineup before his opposing batting average would be that high, He finished the season 6–2 with an ERA of 3.93 in 24 starts. In  innings, he struck out 165 batters, and gave up 70 walks.

Ray pitched a career high 33 starts in 2019 despite averaging less than 6 innings per start. He was 12–8 with a 4.34 ERA in  innings, tying his career best innings pitched from 2016. He also struck out a career-high 235 batters.

On August 16, 2020, Ray reached 1,000 MLB career strikeouts.

In 2020 with Arizona he was 1–4 with a 7.84 ERA. He led the NL in walks given up (31).

Toronto Blue Jays
On August 31, 2020, the Diamondbacks traded Ray along with cash considerations to the Toronto Blue Jays in exchange for Travis Bergen. On September 1, 2020, he made his Blue Jays debut. With the 2020 Toronto Blue Jays, Ray appeared in 5 games, compiling a 1–1 record with 4.79 ERA and 25 strikeouts in 20.2 innings pitched. He re-signed with the Blue Jays for the 2021 season, signing a 1 year, $8 million contract. On July 11, 2021, Ray took a no-hitter into the 7th inning against the Tampa Bay Rays when a one-out double by Yandy Díaz broke it up.

On August 30, he struck out 10 Orioles and reached 1,000 career innings pitched. His 1,244 strikeouts are the most in Major League history through a player's first 1,000 career innings pitched.

Ray finished the 2021 season with a 13–7 record and led the American League in ERA (2.84), strikeouts (248), innings pitched, and WHIP (1.04). He left 90.1% of runners on base, tops in the majors. Ray won the American League Cy Young Award in a near-unanimous vote, receiving 29 of 30 first-place votes. He also won the Players Choice Award for AL Outstanding Pitcher.

Seattle Mariners
On November 30, 2021, the Seattle Mariners signed Ray to a five-year contract worth $115 million, with an opt-out after three years and a no-trade clause.

In 2022 he was 12-12 with a 3.71 ERA in 187 innings, and led the majors in pickoffs at first base, with six.

Pitch selection

Personal life
Ray married Taylor Pasma on November 2014. They have two sons and one daughter. Ray is a Christian.

References

External links

1991 births
Living people
American League ERA champions
American League strikeout champions
Arizona Diamondbacks players
Baseball players from Tennessee
Cy Young Award winners
Detroit Tigers players
Glendale Desert Dogs players
Hagerstown Suns players
Harrisburg Senators players
Major League Baseball pitchers
National League All-Stars
People from Brentwood, Tennessee
Potomac Nationals players
Reno Aces players
Seattle Mariners players
Toledo Mud Hens players
Toronto Blue Jays players
Vermont Lake Monsters players